Apoyo a la Seguridad Ciudadana de Pichilemu is a public safety agency of Pichilemu, a city in central Chile on the coast of the Pacific Ocean.  This agency is directed by the Mayor of Pichilemu, Roberto Córdova.

History
The agency was created in January 2010 by Mayor of Pichilemu Roberto Córdova together with the Investigations Police of Chile, Carabineros de Chile, the Chilean Army, the Pichilemu Fire Bureau and Corporación Nacional Forestal.

The agency started with one vehicle, with 15 inspectors trained by Carabineros de Chile. Roberto Córdova told El Tipógrafo that "the agency was created because several people asked him to improve the public and citizen safety."

The agency was initially proposed within a plan called "Verano Seguro", by the Pichilemu Hospital, Investigations Police of Chile, the Chilean Army, amidst other organizations.

References

Government of Pichilemu
Organizations based in Pichilemu
Government agencies established in 2010
2010 establishments in Chile
Law enforcement agencies of Chile